FBLN1 is the gene encoding fibulin-1, an extracellular matrix and plasma protein.

Function 
Fibulin-1 is a secreted glycoprotein that is found in association with extracellular matrix structures including fibronectin-containing fibers, elastin-containing fibers and basement membranes. Fibulin-1 binds to a number of extracellular matrix constituents including fibronectin, nidogen-1, and the proteoglycan, versican. Fibulin-1 is also a blood protein capable of binding to fibrinogen.

Structure 

Fibulin-1 has modular domain structure and includes a series of nine epidermal growth factor-like modules followed by a fibulin-type module, a module found in all members of the fibulin gene family.

The human fibulin-1 gene, FBLN1, encodes four splice variants designated fibulin-1A, B, C and D, which differ in their carboxy terminal regions. In mouse, chicken and the nematode, C. elegans, only two fibulin-1 variants are produced, fibulin-1C and fibulin-1D.

Interactions 

FBLN1 has been shown to interact with:

 NOV/CCN3, 
 amyloid precursor protein, 
 entactin, 
 fibrinogen, and
 fibronectin.

See also 
 Synpolydactyly

References

Further reading